Bishnupur is a town in Bishnupur district  in the state of Manipur, India. It derived its name from an ancient Vishnu temple located in the town which was established in 15th Century. Bishunupur is the administrative headquarters of Bishnupur District.

In ancient times, Tongjei Maril, lit. 'tubehole') through Bishnupur was the sole road linking Manipur with the rest of India. Bishnupur was one of the sites of the World War II where fierce fightings between the Allied Forces and the Japanese Forces took place. The British war hero, Major-General Orde Wingate, the founder of the Chindits force, died in a plane crash near Bishnupur while flying back from Chindit-held bases in Burma. Many descendants of Japanese armed forces who died here during the War visit Bishnupur to pay homage to their departed ancestors.

Civic administration 

Bishnupur is a municipal council. There are 12 wards in Bishunpur Municipal Council.

Demographics 

As of the 2011 Census of India, Bishnupur has a population of about 16,264. Males (5,324)constitute 52% of the population and females (4,940) 48%. Bishnupur has an average literacy rate of 82%; with male literacy of 82% and female literacy of 72%. 12% of the population is under 6 years of age. This town is home to Meiteis, Pangals (Manipuri Muslims) and Scheduled Tribes.

Economy

Agriculture
The main occupation of the people of Bishnupur is agriculture. Rice, potato, cabbage, pulses, brinjal and tomato are the main crops cultivated and produced in the town. All the crops and vegetables grown in the hills and lakes are available in Bishupur.

Tourist attractions

Loukoipat
Loukoipat, a small natural lake sandwiched between two knolls is a picturesque tourist spot in Bishnupur. Here, the beauty of hills converges with the beauty of lake. The panoramic view of the Manipur valley from the higher slopes of Loukoipat tourist lodge is sure to please the viewers' senses. Loukoipat is further being developed with an ecological park.

Vishnu Temple
Vishnu Temple at Bishnupur is a 15th-century temple dedicated to Lord Vishnu. King Kyamba of Manipur along with Chaopha Khe Khomba, the king of Pong, conquered Kyang, a Shan kingdom in the Kabaw Valley of present Myanmar. Jubilant at the victory, an idol of Lord Vishnu was given by the Pong king to King Kyamba. King Kyamba started worshipping the idol at Lumlangdong which then came to be known as Bishnupur i.e. abode of Vishnu. Subsequently, he built a Vishnu Temple of brick at Bishnupur which has now become a protected historical monument under the Ministry of H.R.D (Archeology), Government of India. It is now standing as a symbol of the remains of ancient times. And the statue got by Kyamba from the Pong king is very important since it gives us the idea of the religious beliefs of those days and the very name that it had given.

During the rule of Kyamba the worship of Vishnu began in Manipur again. A little image of Lord Vishnu was presented by the King of Pong when he concluded a treaty with the king of Manipur in 1470 AD. Kyamba built a brick temple at Bishnupur and installed the image there. In this way the worship of Lord Vishnu began in Manipur again. But "in spite of regular worship of Vishnu Kyamba was not initiated to Vaishnavism by a preceptor."

Politics
Bishnupur is a part of Inner Manipur (Lok Sabha constituency).

References

 
Cities and towns in Bishnupur district